The School of the Art Institute of Chicago (SAIC) is a private art school associated with the Art Institute of Chicago (AIC) in Chicago, Illinois. Tracing its history to an art students' cooperative founded in 1866, which grew into the museum and school, SAIC has been accredited since 1936 by the Higher Learning Commission, by the National Association of Schools of Art and Design since 1944 (charter member), and by the Association of Independent Colleges of Art and Design (AICAD) since the associations founding in 1991. Additionally it is accredited by the National Architectural Accrediting Board. In a 2002 survey conducted by Columbia University's National Arts Journalism Program, SAIC was named the “most influential art school” in the United States.

Its downtown Chicago campus consists of seven buildings located in the immediate vicinity of the AIC building. SAIC is in an equal partnership with the AIC and shares many administrative resources such as design, construction, and human resources. The campus, located in the Loop, comprises chiefly five main buildings: the McLean Center (112 S. Michigan Ave.), the Michigan building (116 S Michigan Ave),  the Sharp (36 S. Wabash Ave.), Sullivan Center (37 S. Wabash Ave.), and the Columbus (280 S. Columbus Dr.). SAIC also holds classes in the Spertus building at 610 S. Michigan. SAIC owns additional buildings throughout Chicago that are used as student galleries or investments. There are three dormitory facilities: The Buckingham, Jones Hall, and 162 N State Street residencies.

History 
The institute has its roots in the 1866 founding of the Chicago Academy of Design, which local artists established in rented rooms on Clark Street.  It was financed by member dues and patron donations. Four years later, the school moved into its own Adams Street building, which was destroyed in the Great Chicago Fire of 1871.

Because of the school's financial and managerial problems after this loss, business leaders in 1878 formed a board of trustees and founded the Chicago Academy of Fine Arts.  They expanded its mission beyond education and exhibitions to include collecting. In 1882, the academy was renamed the Art Institute of Chicago.  The banker Charles L. Hutchinson served as its elected president until his death in 1924. The school grew to become among the "most influential" art schools in the United States.

Walter E. Massey served as president from 2010–July 2016. The current president is Elissa Tenny, formerly the school's provost.

Academics 

SAIC offers classes in art and technology; arts administration; art history, theory, and criticism; art education and art therapy; ceramics; fashion design; filmmaking; historic preservation; architecture; interior architecture; designed objects; journalism; painting and drawing; performance; photography; printmaking; sculpture; sound; new media; video; visual communication; visual and critical studies; animation; illustration; fiber; and writing. SAIC also serves as a resource for issues related to the position and importance of the arts in society.

SAIC also offers an interdisciplinary Low-Residency MFA for students wishing to study the fine arts and/or writing.

Chicago Architects Oral History Project
In 1983, the Department of Architecture began the Chicago Architects Oral History Project. More than 78 architects have contributed.

Demographics
As of fall 2018, the student enrollment at SAIC is demographically classified as follows:

Total Enrollment: 3,640

Undergraduate students: 2,895

Graduate students: 745

Sex:

Female: 74.3%

Male: 25.7%

International and ethnic origin:

International students: 33% (countries represented: 67)

United States students:  67%, further subdivided as follows:

White: 32.6%

Hispanic: 10.4%

Asian or Pacific Islander: 8.9%

African American: 3.3%

American Indian: 0.2%

Multiethnic: 2.8%

Not Specified: 8.4%

Geographic distribution of United States students:

Midwest: 41.2% (includes 8.8% from Chicago)

Northeast: 16.5%

West: 19.4%

South: 22.8%

Activities

Visiting Artists Program
Founded in 1868, the Visiting Artists Program (VAP) is one of the oldest public programs of the School of the Art Institute of Chicago. Formalized in 1951 by Flora Mayer Witkowsky's endowment of a supporting fund, the Visiting Artists Program hosts public presentations by artists, designers, and scholars each year in lectures, symposia, performances, and screenings. It showcases work in all media, including sound, video, performance, poetry, painting, and independent film; in addition to significant curators, critics, and art historians.

Recent visiting artists have included Catherine Opie, Andi Zeisler, Aaron Koblin, Jean Shin, Sam Lipsyte, Ben Marcus, Marilyn Minter, Pearl Fryar, Tehching Hsieh, Homi K. Bhabha, Bill Fontana, Wolfgang Laib, Suzanne Lee, and Amar Kanwar among others.

Additionally, the Distinguished Alumni Series brings alumni back to the community to present their work and reflect on how their experiences at SAIC have shaped them. Recent alumni speakers include Tania Bruguera, Jenni Sorkin, Kori Newkirk, Maria Martinez-Cañas, Saya Woolfalk, Jun Nguyen-Hatsushiba, Trevor Paglen, and Sanford Biggers to name a few.

Galleries
SAIC Galleries - Located at 33 E. Washington Street, SAIC Galleries occupies four floors and offers 26,000 square feet of exhibition space for annual student and faculty shows, as well as special exhibitions featuring national and international artists. 
Sullivan Galleries- Located to the 7th floor of the Sullivan Center at 33 S. State Street. With shows and projects often led by faculty or student curators, it is a teaching gallery. In the Spring of 2020 SAIC announced it would relocate its galleries and Department of Exhibitions & Exhibition Studies from 33 S. State Street to 33 E. Washington Street after ten years of operation.
SITE Galleries (formerly Student Union Galleries) - Founded in 1994, SITE, once known as the Student Union Galleries (SUGs), is a student-run organization at the School of the Art Institute of Chicago (SAIC) for the exhibition of student work. They have two locations: The SITE Sharp of the 37 South Wabash Avenue building; and SITE Columbus of the 280 South Columbus Drive building. The two locations allow the galleries to cycle two shows simultaneously.

Student organizations

ExTV 
ExTV is a student-run time-arts platform that broadcasts online and on campus. Its broadcasts are available via monitors located throughout the 112 S. Michigan building, the 37 S Wabash building, and the 280 S. Columbus building.

F Newsmagazine
F Newsmagazine is SAIC's student-run newspaper. The magazine is a monthly publication with a run of 12,000 copies. Copies are distributed throughout the city, mainly at locations frequented by students such as popular diners and movie theaters.

Free Radio SAIC
Free Radio SAIC is the student-run Internet radio station of The School of the Art Institute of Chicago. Free Radio uses an open programming format and encourage its DJs to explore and experiment with the medium of live radio. Program content and style vary but generally include music from all genres, sound art, narratives, live performances, current events and interviews. 

Featured bands and guests on Free Radio SAIC include Nü Sensae, The Black Belles, Thomas Comerford, Kevin Michael Richardson, Jeff Bennett, Carolyn Lawrence, and much more.

Student government
The student government of SAIC is unique in that its constitution requires four officers holding equal power and responsibility. Elections are held every year. There are no campaign requirements. Any group of four students may run for office, but there must always be four students.

The student government is responsible for hosting a school-wide student meeting once a month. At these meetings students discuss school concerns of any nature. The predominant topic is funding for the various student organizations. Organizations which desire funding must present a proposal at the meeting by which the students vote whether they should receive monies or not. The student government cannot participate in the vote: only oversee it.

Ranking 
In a survey conducted by the National Arts Journalism Program at Columbia University, SAIC was named the “most influential art school” by art critics at general interest news publications from across the United States. `the school has a graduation rate of 68%. 

In 2017, U.S. News & World Report's college rankings ranked SAIC the fourth best overall graduate program for fine arts in the U.S. tying with the Rhode Island school of Design. In January 2013, The Global Language Monitor ranked SAIC as the #5 college in the U.S., the highest ever for an art or design school in a general college ranking.

In 2020 and 2021, U.S. News & World Report ranked SAIC as the second best overall graduate program for fine arts in the U.S. tied with Yale University. In 2021, the university was ranked the seventh globally according to the QS World University Rankings by the subject Art and Design.

Notable people

Controversy

Mirth & Girth 

On May 11, 1988, a student painting depicting Harold Washington, the first black mayor of Chicago, was taken down by three of the city's African-American aldermen based on its content. The painting by David Nelson, titled Mirth & Girth, was of Washington clad only in women's underwear and holding a pencil. Washington had died suddenly less than six months earlier, on November 25, 1987.

After the aldermen held the painting hostage, Police Superintendent LeRoy Martin ordered officers to take it into custody. Art students protested. The painting was returned after a day. The American Civil Liberties Union (ACLU) filed a lawsuit against the Chicago Police Department and the aldermen. The ACLU claimed the removal violated Nelson's First, Fourth, and Fourteenth amendment rights. A 1992 federal court affirmed his constitutional rights had been violated. In 1994 the city agreed to a settlement to end litigation; the money would go toward attorneys' fees for the ACLU. The three aldermen agreed not to appeal the 1992 ruling, and the Police Department established procedures over seizure of materials protected by the First Amendment.

What Is the Proper Way to Display a U.S. Flag? 

In February 1989, as part of a piece entitled What Is the Proper Way to Display a U.S. Flag?, a student named "Dread" Scott Tyler spread a Flag of the United States on the floor of the institute. The piece consisted of a podium, set upon the flag, and containing a notebook for viewers to express how they felt about the exhibit. In order for viewers to write in the notebook, they would have to walk on the flag, which is a violation of customary practice and code. While the exhibit faced protests from veterans and bomb threats, the school stood by the student's art. That year, the school's state funding was cut from $70,000 to $1, and the piece was publicly condemned by President George H. W. Bush. Scott would go on to be one of the defendants in United States v. Eichman, a Supreme Court case in which it was eventually decided that federal laws banning flag desecration were unconstitutional.

Academic freedom controversy
In 2017, a controversy arose after Michael Bonesteel, an adjunct professor specializing in outsider art,  and comics, resigned after actions taken by the institute following two Title IX complaints by transgender students being filed against him in which each criticized his comments and class discussion. The institute initiated an investigation and took certain actions. Bonesteel described the SAIC investigation as a "Kafkaesque trial", in which he was never shown copies of the complaints. He claimed he was assumed to be "guilty until proven innocent" and that SAIC "feels more like a police state than a place where academic freedom and the open exchange of ideas is valued".

Laura Kipnis, author of a book on Title IX cases in which she argues that universities follow reckless and capricious approaches, argued that SAIC was displaying "jawdropping cowardice". She said, "The idea that students are trying to censor or curb a professor’s opinions or thinking is appalling".  The school said the claims made against it were "problematic" and "misleading", and that it supports academic freedom.

Property 
This is a list of property in order of acquisition:
 280 South Columbus (classrooms, departmental offices, studios, Betty Rymer Gallery)
37 South Wabash (classrooms, main administrative offices, Flaxman Library)
112 South Michigan (classrooms, departmental offices, studios, ballroom)
7 West Madison (student residences)
162 North State (student residences)
164 North State Street (Gene Siskel Film Center)
116 South Michigan

SAIC also owns these properties outside of the immediate vicinity of the Chicago Loop:
1926 North Halsted (gallery space) in Chicago.
Ox-Bow School of Art and Artists Residency, Saugatuck, Michigan (affiliated with SAIC)

SAIC leases:
36 South Wabash, leasing the 12th floor (administrative offices, Architecture and Interior Architecture Design Center)
36 South Wabash, leasing the 7th floor (Fashion Design department, Gallery 2)
36 South Wabash, leasing offices on the 14th floor (administrative offices)
36 South Wabash, leasing offices on the 15th floor (administrative offices)

Academic partnerships 
 Glasgow School of Art (United Kingdom)

References 

 
Universities and colleges in Chicago
Art schools in Illinois
Educational institutions established in 1866
Film schools in Illinois
Art museums and galleries in Chicago
1866 establishments in Illinois
Arts organizations established in 1866
Private universities and colleges in Illinois
Oral history
Universities and colleges accredited by the Higher Learning Commission